Three the Hard Way may refer to:

 Three the Hard Way (film), a 1974 movie starring Jim Kelly
 3 the Hard Way, a hip hop group from New Zealand
 "3 the Hard Way", a song from the 2004 album To the 5 Boroughs by the Beastie Boys
 Lyrics from "El Shabazz", a song by LL Cool J from his 1985 album ''Radio